Dutch players Justin Eleveld and Jannick Lupescu chose to not defend their 2010 title, when they defeated Kevin Krawietz and Dominik Schulz in the final.
Filip Horanský and Jiří Veselý won this year's title, by defeating Ben Wagland and Andrew Whittington 6–4, 6–4 in the final match.

Seeds

Draw

Finals

Top half

Bottom half

External links
 Main Draw

Boys' Doubles
2011 Boys' Doubles